Macedonia competed at the 2008 Summer Paralympics in Beijing, China.

Shooting

See also
North Macedonia at the Paralympics
Macedonia at the 2008 Summer Olympics

External links
Beijing 2008 Paralympic Games Official Site
International Paralympic Committee

References

Nations at the 2008 Summer Paralympics
2008
Paralympics